The 1929–30 season was the thirty-fifth season in which Dundee competed at a Scottish national level, playing in Division One, where they would finish in 14th place. Dundee would also compete in the Scottish Cup, where they would make it to the Quarter-finals before being knocked out by Heart of Midlothian in a replay.

Scottish Division One 

Statistics provided by Dee Archive.

League table

Scottish Cup 

Statistics provided by Dee Archive.

Player Statistics 
Statistics provided by Dee Archive

|}

See also 

 List of Dundee F.C. seasons

References

External links 

 1929-30 Dundee season on Fitbastats

Dundee F.C. seasons
Dundee